(You are like a flower), WAB 64, is a song, which Anton Bruckner composed in 1861.

History 

Bruckner composed the song on a text of Heinrich Heine on 5 December 1861. On request of his friend Alois Weinwurm, Bruckner composed the song for the opening concert of the Liedertafel Sängerbund.

The piece became a favourite of Sängerbund.

Bruckner's manuscript of 5 December 1861 (A-LIsakaWAB64) is stored in the archive of the city of Linz.Another undated work manuscript (Mus.Hs.3166) is stored in the archive of the Österreichische Nationalbibliothek.

Text 

The song uses a text of Heinrich Heine's  (Book of Songs).

Music 
The 32-bar long work in F major is scored for  quartet.

Discography 
There are two recordings of the song:
 Johannes Hiemetsberger, Chorus sine nomine, Romantik rediscovered - European choral gems of the 19th century – CD: Helbling C8352CD, 2017
 Reiner E. Moritz, Anton Bruckner - The making of a giant – BR: Arthaus Musik NTSSC, 2021A recording of seven motets, and two Weltliche Chorwerke: Du bist wie eine Blume and the premiere of Vaterlandslied by Alexander Koller with Hard-Chor-Linz and the Linzer Sängerakademie, is together with the documentary.
NB: A rehearsal of the song can be heard on Youtube.
Note
 A fragment, sung by the Chor der Singakademie Linz, can be heard from the 30th minute of the videofilm  of Hans Conrad Fischer (1975).
 A performance by Stephen Cleobury with the BBC Choir (2011) is put in the Bruckner Archive: Charter Oak COR-2178 (box of 2 CDs).

References

Sources 
 August Göllerich, Anton Bruckner. Ein Lebens- und Schaffens-Bild,  – posthumous edited by Max Auer by G. Bosse, Regensburg, 1932
 Anton Bruckner – Sämtliche Werke, Band XXIII/2:  Weltliche Chorwerke (1843–1893), Musikwissenschaftlicher Verlag der Internationalen Bruckner-Gesellschaft, Angela Pachovsky and Anton Reinthaler (Editor), Vienna, 1989
 Cornelis van Zwol, Anton Bruckner 1824–1896 – Leven en werken, uitg. Thoth, Bussum, Netherlands, 2012. 
 Uwe Harten, Anton Bruckner. Ein Handbuch. , Salzburg, 1996. .
 Crawford Howie, Anton Bruckner - A documentary biography, online revised edition

External links 
 
 Du bist wie eine Blume F-Dur, WAB 64 – Critical discography by Hans Roelofs 

Weltliche Chorwerke by Anton Bruckner
1861 compositions
Compositions in F major